The 1908 Howard Bulldogs football team was an American football team that represented Howard College (now known as the Samford University) as an independent during the 1908 college football season. The team compiled an 2–4 record, with John Counselman going 0–2 through the first two games and Winton M. Blount going 2–2 for the final four games of the season.

Schedule

References

Howard
Samford Bulldogs football seasons
Howard Bulldogs football